A Box of Their Best is the first US box set by Electric Light Orchestra (ELO), released in 1980. It consisted of the albums A New World Record (with the sides reversed), Out of the Blue and Discovery. Also included was Jeff Lynne's first ever solo single, "Doin' That Crazy Thing". This single, a one-sided single that was marked as a promo, was not in all releases of the box. The box set is almost identical to the UK release Four Light Years, released the same year.

Track listing

All songs written by Jeff Lynne.

7" single
"Doin' That Crazy Thing" – 3:21

A New World Record

Out of the Blue

Discovery

Personnel
Jeff Lynne – vocals, guitars, piano, synthesizer
Bev Bevan – drums, percussion
Richard Tandy – piano, synthesizer, electric piano, clavinet
Kelly Groucutt – bass guitar, vocals

Additional personnel on sides 1–6
Mik Kaminski – violin
Melvyn Gale – cello
Hugh McDowell – cello

References

1980 greatest hits albums
Albums produced by Jeff Lynne
Electric Light Orchestra compilation albums
Epic Records compilation albums